Maximilian Ritter von Höhn (16 August 1859 - 26 April 1936) was a general Royal Bavarian Army during World War I.

Biography
He was born on 16 August 1859 in Kitzingen. He served in World War I and was promoted to General der Artillerie in 1916. After the war, in 1919, he was given command of the I Royal Bavarian Corps and retired. He died on 26 April 1936 in Munich.

References

1859 births
1936 deaths
Bavarian generals
Generals of Artillery (Reichswehr)
People from Kitzingen